Yerlikaya is a Turkish surname formed by the combination of the Turkish words yerli ("local; native") and kaya ("rock") and may refer to:

 Ali Yerlikaya (born 1968), Turkish bureaucrat
 Hamza Yerlikaya (born 1976), Turkish sport wrestler
 Hayrettin Yerlikaya (born 1981), Turkish footballer

Turkish-language surnames